The 1939 Kennington by-election was a parliamentary by-election held on 24 May 1939 for the British House of Commons constituency of Kennington.

Previous MP

Result

Aftermath 
In the 1945 general election,

References

Kennington by-election
Kennington by-election
Kennington by-election
Kennington,1939
Kennington,1939
Kennington